The name Kai-tak has been used for four tropical cyclones in the western Pacific Ocean. The name was contributed by Hong Kong, and refers to that city's former airport. Names in parenthesis were given by PAGASA in the Philippines.
 Typhoon Kai-tak (2000) (T0004, 06W, Edeng) – brushed the coasts of mainland China and Taiwan.
 Typhoon Kai-tak (2005) (T0521, 22W) – late-season storm that made landfall in Vietnam.
 Typhoon Kai-tak (2012) (T1213, 14W, Helen) – made landfall in the Philippines and China.
 Tropical Storm Kai-tak (2017) (T1726, 32W, Urduja) – affected the Philippines.

The name Kai-tak was retired by the WMO in 2018, and is replaced with Yun-yeung to be used for future seasons. The name "Yun-yeung" refers to the mandarin duck, a species of duck native to East Asia; the name also refers to a popular drink in Hong Kong.

Pacific typhoon set index articles